Cache  is a frazione of the city of Aosta, in the Aosta Valley region of Italy.

References

Frazioni of Aosta Valley
Aosta